Alexander Lee Moore (born May 22, 1945) is a former American football running back who played one season with the Denver Broncos of the American Football League (AFL). He was drafted by the San Francisco 49ers in the fourteenth round of the 1968 NFL Draft. He played college football at Norfolk State University and attended East High School in Columbus, Ohio.

References

External links
Just Sports Stats

Living people
1945 births
Players of American football from Georgia (U.S. state)
American football running backs
Norfolk State Spartans football players
Denver Broncos (AFL) players
People from West Point, Georgia